Kruger House may refer to:

 Kruger House, Pretoria, South African Republic
 Kruger House (Truckee, California), United States